"Sweet Blindness" is a song written by Laura Nyro, released in 1968, and included on her Eli and the Thirteenth Confession.

Background
The song was a drinking song that sounded old fashioned, noted for its rhythm changes as well as its brass section. The song ends with a noted Count Basie piano riff before the brass holds a long jazzy cadenza.

The 5th Dimension recording
The best known version was recorded by The 5th Dimension  later in 1968.  It was featured on their 1968 album Stoned Soul Picnic. The song was produced by Bones Howe and arranged by Bill Holman, Bob Alcivar, Ray Pohlman, and Howe. It reached #13 on the Billboard Hot 100 and #45 on the U.S. R&B chart. Outside the US, "Sweet Blindness" went to #15 in Canada and #19 in Australia.

Other versions
Holly Cole released a version of the song on the 1997 tribute album Time and Love: The Music of Laura Nyro.

In media
The 5th Dimension sang a version of the song with Frank Sinatra on his 1968 television special, Francis Albert Sinatra Does His Thing.

References

1968 songs
1968 singles
Songs written by Laura Nyro
The 5th Dimension songs
Laura Nyro songs
Frank Sinatra songs
Song recordings produced by Bones Howe
Songs about alcohol